Jacques Amyot  (13 November 1924 – 7 September 2018) was a Canadian swimmer from Quebec.

Early years
Born in Quebec City in 1924, Amyot was interested in a career as a cyclist, but instead turned to long distance swimming. After placing second in a two-mile race at Lake St. Joseph in 1939, he was spotted by coach Jos Lachance.

Professional career
Amyot began swimming professionally in 1948, participating in the Olympic trials for the London Olympics' 1500 metre freestyle. At the time, there was no long distance event at the Olympics.

On July 23, 1955, Amyot made the first recorded crossing of Lac Saint-Jean. In 1956, he crossed the English Channel at the Strait of Dover between France and Great Britain, completing it in just over 13 hours in strong currents and  water. In 1975, at age 50, he completed the channel loop between countries in a half hour less.

Amyot held about 50 records in Quebec and 15 Canadian records in open water swimming. He was elected to the Quebec Sports Hall of Fame in 1993, the Quebec Swimming Hall of Fame in 1998, and made a Knight of the National Order of Quebec in 2001. The town of Roberval also erected a bust in his honour, and the Quebec Athlete Gala created a trophy in his name.

Death
On the morning of 7 September 2018, it was reported that Amyot died overnight of cancer at age 93.

References

1924 births
2018 deaths
Canadian long-distance swimmers
French Quebecers
Knights of the National Order of Quebec
Swimmers from Quebec City
English Channel swimmers